Saint-Junien-la-Bregère is a commune in the Creuse department in central France.

The only commercial operations are forestry, farming and a small campsite. The name of the commune is a corruption of Saint Junien les Bruyères (heath).

Population

See also
Communes of the Creuse department

References

External links

 Commune Web site

Communes of Creuse